Te Tai Tokerau Māori are a group of Māori iwi (tribes) based on the Northland Peninsula of New Zealand's North Island. It includes the far northern Muriwhenua iwi (tribes) of Te Aupōuri, Ngāti Kahu, Ngāti Kurī, Te Pātū, Te Rarawa and Ngāi Takoto. It also includes Ngāpuhi and the affiliated iwi of Ngāti Hine. Elsewhere in the region, it includes Whaingaroa, Ngāti Wai and Ngāti Whātua.

The rohe (tribal areas) of these tribes covers Northland and Auckland.

References